Vanamala or Vanmala Devi (1915-2007) was an Indian actress, appearing in many films in Hindi and Marathi. She is best known for the role of the mother in the Marathi movie Shyamchi Aai, which won the Golden Lotus Award (Swarna Kamal) for Best Film at the 1st National Film Awards in 1954.

Filmography

 1965 Shree Ram Bharat Milan
 1953 Naag Panchami
 1953 Shyamchi Aai... Shyam's Mother
 1948 Azadi Ki Raah Par
 1947 Hatimtai
 1945 Aarti
 1945 Parinde
 1944 Dil Ki Baat
 1944 Kadambari (as Vanmala)
 1944 Parbat Pe Apna Dera... Meera Devi
 1944 Mahakavi Kalidas (as Vanmala)
 1943 Muskurahat
 1943 Shahenshah Akbar
 1942 Raja Rani... Rani
 1942 Vasantsena... Vasantsena
 1941 Payachi Dasi... Vidya
 1941 Sikandar... Rukhsana
 1940 Lapandav

References

External links
 

Indian film actresses
Actresses in Hindi cinema
Indian television actresses
Actresses in Marathi cinema
20th-century Indian actresses
People from Ujjain
1915 births
2007 deaths